VS-35, Sea Control Squadron 35, known as the Blue Wolves was a carrier-based United States Navy squadron based out of Naval Air Station North Island in California. The squadron flew the Lockheed Lockheed S-3B Viking and their mission was mining, undersea and surface warfare, electronic reconnaissance and analysis, over the horizon targeting, and aerial refueling. The squadron was last attached to Carrier Air Wing Fourteen (CVW-14). VS-35 was deactivated in a ceremony at NAS North Island on 24 March 2005, and officially on 31 March 2005.

History

The squadron was the fourth squadron to be designated as VS-35. The first VS-35 was established on 3 January 1961 and disestablished on 30 June 1973. In October 1976, preparations were made to reestablish VS-35 to fly the new turbine-powered S-3A, but fiscal constraints prevented completion of this plan and the second VS-35 was disestablished on 30 March 1977.

The fourth VS-35 began its existence on 3 October 1990, as a pre-establishment detachment with the official establishment on 4 April 1991. The Blue Wolves transitioned to the S-3B in December 1992.

For the first time since 1972, the Blue Wolves deployed on February 17, 1994, on board the USS Carl Vinson to the western Pacific in support of Operation Southern Watch. In 1996, the squadron deployed again on board the Carl Vinson and in support of Operation Southern Watch.

In July 2002, the squadron deployed on board the USS Abraham Lincoln in support of Operation Enduring Freedom and Southern Watch.  After an overall period in Perth, Australia, for the Abraham Lincoln, the Blue Wolves returned to the Persian Gulf to commence combat operations in support of Operation Iraqi Freedom. The squadron returned home on May 2, 2003, after nearly ten months away, the longest for a United States aircraft carrier since the Vietnam War.

Upon returning from Operation Iraqi Freedom, on May 1, 2003, the squadron flew President George W. Bush on board the USS Abraham Lincoln for his "Mission Accomplished" speech. The Blue Wolves have the distinction of being the only Navy squadron with the designator Navy One.

Upon returning in October 2004, the squadron began preparations for deactivation. Official deactivation occurred on 31 March 2005.

Mission
Over land employ the LANTIRN Targeting System to localize enemies and track them until given the authority to kill them. Use laser guided maverick missiles or buddy laze in order for others to use laser guided weapons on enemies.  Pass precise coordinates to allied forces on the ground or in the air to deliver precision guided munitions to bear. Over the sea, use Automated Information System, Data Link, ESM, Radar, ISAR, NVDs, and Infrared systems to find ships.  Pass their position to surface ships who will board and detain the enemy. Overhead the ship, use refueling stores. The maintenance team will get the Vikings airborne and the aircrew will put the jets in position for expeditious rendezvous in the tanker pattern.

See also
History of the United States Navy
List of inactive United States Navy aircraft squadrons
List of United States Navy aircraft squadrons

References

GlobalSecurity: VS-35

Military units and formations in California
Sea control squadrons of the United States Navy